The Book 2 is the second Japanese-language extended play (EP) and third overall by Japanese duo Yoasobi. It was released on December 1, 2021, through Sony Music Entertainment Japan, eleven months after their debut EP The Book (2021). It consists of eight tracks, preceded by their all singles released in 2021, and included the new song "Moshi mo Inochi ga Egaketara". In support of the EP, the duo held their first face-to-face concert Nice to Meet You on December 4–5 at Nippon Budokan. Commercially, The Book 2 debuted at number two on the Oricon Albums Chart, and atop Billboard Japan Hot Albums and certified gold by Recording Industry Association of Japan (RIAJ).

Background and release

In 2021, Yoasobi released the debut EP The Book, preceded by the singles released from 2019 to 2020. It peaked at number two on both Oricon Albums Chart, and Billboard Japan Hot Albums, and atop the Oricon Digital Albums Chart for five consecutive weeks. According to Oricon, the EP sold over 200,000  units in Japan in the first half of 2021 and was certified gold for physical release and later downloads by Recording Industry Association of Japan (RIAJ).

On September 30, 2021, Yoasobi tweeted "IOOI / NOON" with the mysterious four images of the cartoonish vertical and horizontal rotating bookshelf. They show the colored cover books with the title "Yoasobi Story", the dates, and the word "noon", and the book spines with the duo's English song title, the latest livestream concert title Sing Your World, and the slogan "novel into music" among mostly plain and a few colored book spines. A day later, on the duo's second anniversary, they announced the second EP, titled The Book 2 and its track listing, scheduled for release on December 1. Pre-order began on the same day of the announcement.

Promotion

On December 1, 2022, the same day as The Book 2 announcement, they also announced "Nice to Meet You Countdown" for the new announcement every Friday at noon (JST) for ten weeks until December 3, The second revealing is the standalone single of "Tsubame", issued on October 25, and the final announced that the duo would appear on the documentary program , broadcast on December 12. On November 23, Yoasobi released the EP's snippets "crossfade movie" and announced a phone call campaign as they did when promoting The Book. Fans can make a telephone call on November 23–30 for commentary of The Book 2 tracks daily. On the last day of the campaign, during their radio show, fans can call directly with the duo. 

They gave a televised debut performance of "Mō Sukoshi Dake" on December 1 at 2021 FNS Music Festival. The duo appeared on Songs the next day, and performed "Loveletter", "Taishō Roman", and "Tsubame" together with Midories for the first time. They appeared on the 6-hour special edition of Music Station, titled Music Station Ultra Super Live 2021 on December 24, to perform "Sangenshoku". The duo gave debut performances of "Kaibutsu", "Yasashii Suisei", and "Moshi no Inochi ga Egaketara" on December 30 at 63th Japan Record Awards, and participated 72nd NHK Kōhaku Uta Gassen on the New Year's Eve to perform "Gunjō" and "Tsubame" with Midories.

Nice to Meet You

On October 1, 2022, Yoasobi announced their one-off concert, titled Nice to Meet You in support of The Book 2. It was held between December 4 and 5 at Nippon Budokan, Tokyo, Japan, marking their first face-to-face concert since their debut in 2019. The performance of "Kaibutsu" from the first day of concert was lived via YouTube as part of the virtual online music festival YouTube Music Weekend. In addition to in-venue, livestream was also available for the official fan club website Club Yoasobi via Stagecrowd.

The first-day show was re-run via Wowow on January 22, 2022. The footage of the concert was included on the duo's first video album The Film, released on March 23, which use the concert performances of "Moshi mo Inochi ga Egaketara" and "Tsubame" to promote the album. The duo uploaded three shows from the first day of the concert, which originally broadcast through Wowow, between July 26 to 28 at 17:00 JST, consisting of "Kaibutsu", "Yasashii Suisei", and Gunjō.

Set list

This set list is representative of the show on both December 4 and 5, 2021.

 "Ano Yume o Nazotte"
 "Taishō Roman"
 "Halzion"
 "Sangenshoku"
 "Mō Sukoshi Dake"
 "Haruka"
 "Tabun"
 "Moshi mo Inochi ga Egaketara"
 "Yoru ni Kakeru"
 "Kaibutsu"
 "Yasashii Suisei"
 "Encore"
 "Tsubame"
 "Gunjō"
Encore
 "Loveletter"

Accolades

Commercial performance

The Book 2 debuted at number two on both Oricon Albums Chart and Combined Albums Chart of December 13, 2021, selling 80,015 CDs in its first week, behind HKT48's Outstanding. It also peaked atop Digital Albums Chart, collecting 10,448 downloads, scored Yoasobi their third number-one digital albums of the chart, after The Book, and E-Side. For Billboard Japan, The Book 2 debuted at number one on the Hot Albums, making it the first number-one album of the chart. It opened with 83,585 CD copies (number two on the Top Albums Sales), and 8,717 download albums (number one on the Download Albums). The EP certified gold for physical release by RIAJ on January 14, 2022.

Track listing

Credits and personnel

Credits adapted from The Book 2 liner notes.

 Ayase – songwriter (all), producer (all)
 Ikura – vocals (all)
 Midories – chorus (1)
 AssH – chorus (2), guitar (except 3, 7, 8)
 Honogumo – chorus (2)
 Hikaru Yamamoto – chorus (2)
 Zaquro Misohagi – chorus (2)
 Nana Ototsuki – based story writer (1)
 Yūichirō Komikado – based story writer (2)
 Natsumi – based story writer (3)
 Chiharu – based story writer (4)
 Paru Itagaki – based story writer (5, 6)
 Osamu Suzuki – based story writer (7)
 Hatsune – based story writer (8)
 Takayuki Saitō – vocal recording (all)
 Masahiko Fukui – mixing (all)

Charts

Weekly charts

Monthly charts

Year-end charts

Certifications and sales

Release history

See also

 List of Billboard Japan Hot Albums number ones of 2021

References

2021 EPs
Japanese-language EPs
Sony Music Entertainment Japan EPs
Yoasobi EPs